The Playtones is a Swedish 1950s rock n roll band formed in 2008 in Kallinge. Their music is influenced by rockabilly. It was called Boppin' Steve & The Playtones before 2008. The Playtones won the dansband competition Dansbandskampen in 2009. 2011 the band appeared in Melodifestivalen, the Swedish preselection for the Eurovision Song Contest.

Members
Stefan Jonasson – vocals, piano
Johan Svensson – drums
Mattias Schertell – double bass, electric bass
Jonas Holmberg - guitar

Discography

Albums
As Boppin' Steve & The Playtones

As The Playtones

Others
Rock'n'Roll Christmas Party

Singles

References 

Musical groups established in 2008
Rockabilly music groups
Blekinge
Melodifestivalen contestants of 2011